James Nicholas Bethell, 5th Baron Bethell (born 1 October 1967), is a British hereditary peer and Conservative politician in the House of Lords.

Early life
Bethell was educated at the independent, fee-paying Harrow School before going on to study for a Scottish Master of Arts (an undergraduate degree) at the University of Edinburgh.

Bethell worked as a journalist, and then managed the Ministry of Sound nightclub, before founding Westbourne Communications which he sold to Cicero Group after succeeding to his family titles.

He unsuccessfully contested election to the House of Commons for the Tooting constituency in the 2005 general election, losing to Labour candidate and future Mayor of London Sadiq Khan.

Bethell contested the 2009 primary to become the Conservative Party's prospective parliamentary candidate for the constituency of Gosport. He came second behind Caroline Dinenage, who went on to become the Member of Parliament in the 2010 general election.

Public life
Bethell entered the House of Lords in July 2018, after successfully contesting a Conservative hereditary peers' by-election.

In July 2019, he was appointed a Lord-in-Waiting and, in March 2020, was appointed as Parliamentary Under-Secretary of State for Innovation at the Department of Health and Social Care in the second Johnson ministry.

The Times reported in November 2020 that Bethell is the Minister for NHS Test and Trace, a novelty formed as part of the Johnson ministry's efforts to control the COVID-19 pandemic. He "was a surprise appointment in March having chaired Matt Hancock's leadership campaign in 2019 and giving [him] a £5,000 donation." He opened himself to charges of "cronyism" published in The Guardian over his selection to an advisory role of lobbyists like George Pascoe-Watson, whose clients include the Boston Consulting Group "which has won several large government contracts during the pandemic."

In July 2021, Bethell was placed under investigation by the House of Lords Commissioner for Standards over a  "complaint regarding Lord Bethell sponsoring a pass for Gina Coladangelo", who was a lobbyist and lover of the then Health secretary Matt Hancock.

On 17 September 2021, Lord Bethell left government during the second cabinet reshuffle of the second Johnson ministry.

In November 2021, it emerged that Lord Bethell had been part of a government meeting with Randox, the clinical diagnostics firm for which Owen Paterson was found to have breached parliamentary standards, regarding a 600 million pound contract in which, against protocol, no minutes were taken.

Personal life
Bethell is married to Melissa (née Wong), a businesswoman, Lord and Lady Bethell have four children. He succeeded his father Nicholas as Baron Bethell in 2007.

References

1967 births
Living people
People educated at Harrow School
Alumni of the University of Edinburgh
5
Ministry of Sound
Conservative Party (UK) hereditary peers
Conservative Party (UK) Baronesses- and Lords-in-Waiting
Hereditary peers elected under the House of Lords Act 1999